The Ais or Ays were a Native American people of eastern Florida. Their territory included coastal areas and islands from approximately Cape Canaveral to the Indian River. The Ais chiefdom consisted of a number of towns, each led by a chief who was subordinate to the paramount chief of Ais; the Indian River was known as the "River of Ais" to the Spanish. The Ais language has been linked to the Chitimacha language by linguist Julian Granberry, who points out that "Ais" means "the people" in the Chitimacha language.  The Ais were hunter-gatherers and food was plentiful.   They ate fish, turtle, shellfish, cocoplums, sabal palm berries and other gathered fruits. Prior to contact with European colonizers, the Ais population had grown to several hundred thousand and may have flourished for over 10,000 years.   

A burial mound, used by the Ais tribe for 500 to 1,000 years rises about twenty feet in Old Fort Park on Indian River Drive in Fort Pierce. This location later became an Army fort used during the Second Seminole War (1838-1842) and it may be the location of a Spanish settlement, mission and military outpost dating back to 1567. The burial mound is several hundred feet around. The Indian River, (called the "Rio de Ais" by the Spanish colonizers) flows by within sight.

The best single source for information on the Ais at the end of the 17th century is Jonathan Dickinson's Journal, in which he makes observations on their appearance, diet, and customs. Dickinson and his party were shipwrecked, and spent several weeks among the Ais in 1696. By Dickinson's account, the chief of the town of Jece, near present-day Sebastian, was paramount to all of the coastal towns from the Jaega town of Jobe (at Jupiter Inlet) in the south to approximately Cape Canaveral in the north (that is, the length of the River of Ais).

The Ais had already had considerable contact with Europeans by this time. The Spanish became acquainted with the Ais in middle of the 16th century. In 1566 Pedro Menéndez de Avilés, founder of St. Augustine, Florida, established a fort and mission at an Ais town, which the Spanish called Santa Lucía. After the Ais attacked the fort, killing 23 of the soldiers, the Spanish abandoned the fort and mission. Oathaqua was a major chief of the Ais. Governor Mendez de Canco reported in 1597 that the this chief led more people than any other tribe.  

Spain eventually established some control over the coast; at first, the Ais considered them friends (comerradoes) and non-Spanish Europeans as enemies. A number of Ais men learned some Spanish, and a patrol of Spanish soldiers from St. Augustine arrived in Jece while the Dickinson party was there. One Ais man in Jece had been taken away by the English to work as a diver on a wreck east of Cuba. He got away when the ship put in for water in Cuba, and made his way back to his home via Havana and St. Augustine.

Pedro's bluff
In December of 1571, Pedro Menéndez de Avilés was sailing from Florida to Havana with two frigates when, as he tells it, 
I was wrecked at Cape Canaveral because of a storm which came upon me, and the other boat was lost fifteen leagues further on in the Bahama Channel, in a river they call the Ais, because the cacique is so called. I, by a miracle reached the fort of St. Augustine with seventeen persons I was taking with me. Three times the Indians gave the order to attack me, and the way I escaped them was by ingenuity and arousing fear in them, telling them that behind me many Spaniards were coming who would slay them if they found them.

Enslavement, War, and Disease
In 1605, Governor Pedro de Ibarra sent a soldier, Álvaro Mexía, on a diplomatic mission to the Ais nation. The mission was a success; the Ais agreed to care for shipwrecked sailors for a ransom, and Mexía completed a map of the Indian River area with their help. Numerous European artifacts from shipwrecks have been found in Ais settlements. When the Dickinson party reached the town, there was already in Jece another group of English from a shipwreck. European and African survivors of shipwrecks were fairly common along the coast. The Ais also traded with St. Augustine. Dickinson reports that one man of Jece had approximately five pounds of ambergris; he "boasted that when he went for Augustine with that, he would purchase of the Spaniards a looking-glass, an axe, a knife or two, and three or four mannocoes (which is about five or six pounds) of tobacco."

Shortly after 1700, settlers in the Province of Carolina and their Indian allies started raiding the Ais, killing some and carrying captives to Charles Town to be sold as slaves. In 1743, the Spanish established a short-lived mission on Biscayne Bay (in the area of present-day Miami). The priests assigned to that mission reported the presence of people they called "Santa Luces", perhaps a name for the Ais derived from "Santa Lucia", somewhere to the north of Biscayne Bay. 

After 1703 the Ais were absorbed into the Costas tribe. Their numbers had diminished to 137 individuals by 1711. Diseases brought by the Europeans eradicated the remaining Ais/Costas by the mid-1740’s. The Ais disappear from area records after 1760.

Diet 
Dickinson stated that the Ais "neither sow nor plant any manner of thing whatsoever," but fished and gathered palmetto, cocoplum and seagrape berries. Dickinson described the fishing technique of the neighboring Jaega people of Jobe thus:
[T]he Casseekey [of Jobe] ... sent his son with his striking staff to the inlet to strike fish for us; which was performed with great dexterity; for some of us walked down with him, and though we looked very earnestly when he threw his staff from him could not see a fish at which time he saw it, and brought it onshore on the end of his staff. Sometimes he would run swiftly pursuing a fish, and seldom missed when he darted at him. In two hours time he got as many fish as would serve twenty men[.]

The Ais boiled their fish, and ate them from 'platters' of palmetto leaf:
About noon was some fish brought us on small palmetto leaves, being boiled with scales, head and gills, and nothing taken from then [sic] but the gut[.]

Dickinson also recorded a gift of clams to his wife: 
This day the Cassekey [of Jece] ... made presents to some of us, especially to my wife; he gave her a parcel of shellfish, which are known by the name of clams; one or two he roasted and gave her, showing that she must serve the rest so, and eat them.

The Ais dried some of the berries they gathered for future use: 
This week we observed that great baskets of dried berries were brought in from divers towns and delivered to the king or Young Caseekey [of Jece.]

Dickinson does not say anything about the Ais hunting, but they used deer skins. The neighboring Jaega people of Jobe gave the Dickinson party a hog they had killed.

Clothing 
The Ais men wore a "loincloth" of woven palm leaves. Dickinson describes this as: 
being a piece of platwork of straws wrought of divers colors and of a triangular figure, with a belt of four fingers broad of the same wrought together, which goeth about the waist and the angle of the other having a thing to it, coming between the legs, and strings to the end of the belt; all three meeting together are fastened behind by a horsetail, or a bunch of silkgrass exactly resembling it, of a flaxen color, this being all of the apparel or covering that the men wear.

He has little to say on how the women dressed, recording only that his wife and female slaves were given "raw deer skins" with which to cover themselves after their European clothing had been taken away. Women of the Tequesta tribe, to the south of the Ais, were reported to wear "shawls" made of woven palm leaves, and "skirts” made from draped fibers from the Spanish dagger (yucca), similar to the "grass" skirts of Hawai'i.

Housing 
Dickinson states that the town of Jece "stood about half a mile from the seashore within the land on the sound, being surrounded with a swamp, in which grew white mangrove trees, which hid the town from the sea."

Dickinson describes the cacique's house in Santa Lucea as "about forty foot long and twenty-five foot wide, covered with palmetto leaves both top and sides. There was a range of cabins, or a barbecue on one side and two ends. At the entering on one side of the house a passage was made of benches on each side leading to the cabins."

Subject and related tribes
The Mayaca, who lived along the upper St. Johns River south of Lake George, appear to have spoken a language related to that of the Ais. The Surruque to the north and the Jaega to the south were politically subordinate to the Ais.

Ais Island name proposal 
A proposal to name the barrier island separating the Indian River Lagoon from the Atlantic Ocean "Ponce de León Island" resulted in a counter-proposal to name it "Ais Island". As of December 2012, the United States Board on Geographic Names has rejected both names for the island.

Notes

References
Let us alone.  (1983). William R. Ervin. 
Melbourne and Eau Gallie. (2002).  Karen Raley and Ann Raley Flotte. Arcadia Publishing.
Andrews, Charles Mclean and Andrews, Evangeline Walker (1945). Jonathan Dickinson's Journal or, God's Protecting Providence. Being the Narrative of a Journey from Port Royal in Jamaica to Philadelphia between August 23, 1696, to April 1, 1697. Yale University Press. Reprinted (1981) Florida Classics Library.
Austin, Daniel W. (1997). "The Glades Indians and the Plants They Used: Ethnobotany of an Extinct Culture."  The Palmetto, 17(2):7 -11. (14 September 2002). Accessed 27 November 2005
Barr, Juliana. Peace Came in the Form of a Woman: Indians and Spaniards in the Texas Borderlands. Chapel Hill: University of North Carolina Press, 2007.
Bullen, Adelaide K. (1965). Chapter XXIV Florida Indians of Past and Present, in Tebeau, Carson. Florida from Indian Trail to Space Age. (pp. 317–350). Southern Publishing Company.
Gannon, Michael V. (1965). The Cross in the Sand. University Presses of Florida. 
Milanich, Jerald T. (1995) Florida Indians and the Invasion from Europe. University Press of Florida. 
Sturtevant, William C. (1978). "The Last of the South Florida Aborigines". In Jeral Milanich & Samuel Proctor (Eds.). Tacachale: Essays on the Indians of Florida and Southeastern Georgia during the Historic Period. Gainesville, Florida: The University Presses of Florida.

External links
"Ais Indians", Treasure Lore

See also
 List of Native American peoples in the United States

Extinct Native American peoples
History of Brevard County, Florida
Indian River County, Florida
Indigenous peoples of the Southeastern Woodlands
Native American tribes in Florida
St. Lucie County, Florida
Martin County, Florida